Dentistry Magazine was first published in 1995. The magazine is published by FMC Ltd (Finlayson Media Communications). It has an ABC audited circulation of 21,576 copies.

Dentistry Magazine was originally known as Dentistry Monthly and was printed in A4 format. It focused purely on products and the aim of the founder, Ken Finlayson, was to provide dental professionals with a publication that aided the purchase of products.

Dentistry Magazine is an A3-sized dental periodical published every two weeks. Editorial content comprises the six key sections including news, starting out (for students), clinical, business, education (CPD) and product information.

References

External links
 Dentistry.co.uk - Dentistry Magazine's website
 

Business magazines published in the United Kingdom
Dentistry journals
Magazines established in 1995
Professional and trade magazines
monthly magazines published in the United Kingdom